Shal District is a district (bakhsh) in Buin Zahra County, Qazvin Province, Iran. At the 2006 census, its population was 23,572, in 6,373 families. The District has one city: Shal.  The District has two rural districts (dehestan): Qaleh Hashem Rural District, and Zeynabad Rural District.

References 

Districts of Qazvin Province
Buin Zahra County